List of Hebrew language poets (year links are to corresponding "[year] in poetry" article):

Biblical
 Moses
 King David
 King Solomon
 Jeremiah

Early Middle Ages
 Eleazar ha-Kalir
 Jose b. Jose
 Yannai

Golden Age in Spain
 Joseph ibn Abitur
 Abraham Abulafia
 Meir Halevi Abulafia
 Todros ben Judah Halevi Abulafia
Samuel he-Hasid
 Todros Abulafia
 Yehuda Alharizi (1190-1240)
 Judah Ben Samuel Halevi (born c. 1086)
 Dunash ben Labrat (10th century)
 Santob De Carrion (late 14th century), also a proverb writer
 Abraham ibn Ezra, also known as Abraham ben Meir ibn Ezra (1088-1167), known mainly for Biblical commentaries and grammar works
 Moses ibn Ezra (1070-1139)
 Solomon Ibn Gabirol (1021-1058)
 Isaac ibn Ghiyyat
 Yehuda Halevi
 Joseph Kimhi (1105-1170), born in Spain, he fled to Narbonne, Provence, where he became known as a grammarian, exegete, poet, and translator.
 Shmuel haNagid, also known as Samuel ibn Naghrela or Samuel Ha-Naggid (992-1055)
 Menahem ibn Saruq
 Joseph ben Jacob ibn Zaddik (died 1149)

Medieval Germany
 Baruch of Worms (early 13th century), liturgical poet and commentator
 Meir ben Baruch, known as Ma'aram of Rothenburg (1215-1293), a Talmudist, Tosafist and liturgical poet
 Judah Halevi (born c. 1086)
Judah he-Hasid
 Eleazer ben Judah ben Kalonymus of Worms (1176-1238), a Talmudist, Cabalist, moralist, scientist and poet

Medieval France
 David Hakohen (late 13th century), composer of piyyutim from Avignon
 Isaac Gorni (late 13th century), troubadour from Aire-sur-l'Adour
 Jedaiah ben Abraham Bedersi (1270-1340), poet, philosopher and physician born in Béziers
 Joseph ben Isaac Bekor Shor (12th century), Tosafist, exegete and poet from Orléans

Safed Cabalists
 Solomon Alkabiz (16th century)
 Israel ben Moses Najara (c. 1555-c. 1625)

Italian Renaissance
 Deborah Ascarelli (17th century)
 Immanuel Frances
 Immanuel the Roman also known as Immanuel ben Solomon and Immanuel of Rome (1270-1330), a satirical poet and scholar
 Daniel ben Judah (late 14th century), liturgical poet
 Moshe Chaim Luzzatto, also known as Moses Hayyim Luzzatto (1707-1747)
 Judah Leone Modena, also known as: Leon Modena or Yehudah Aryeh Mi-modena (1571-1648), a rabbi, orator, scholar, teacher and poet
 Sara Copia Sullam (died 1641)

North Africa and Yemen
 Shalom Shabazi

Jewish Enlightenment (Haskalah)
 Isaac Erter (1792-1851) satirist and poet
 Judah Leib Gordon (1831-1892), also known as "Judah Löb ben Asher Gordon" or "Leon Gordon"
 Abraham Baer Gottlober (1811-1899)
 Abraham Dob Bär Lebensohn (1789-1878)
 Micah Joseph Lebensohn (1828-1852)
 Meir Halevi Letteris (1800-1871)
 Isaac Baer Levinsohn (1788-1860)
 Samuel David Luzzatto (1800-1865)
 Rahel Luzzatto Morpurgo (1790-1871)
 Süsskind Raschkow
 Constantin Shapiro (1841-1900)
 Hermann Wassertrilling
 Naphtali Hirz Wessely (1725-1805)

Modern Hebrew

A
 Shimon Adaf (born 1972), Israeli poet and author
Shmuel Yosef Agnon
 Ada Aharoni
 Lea Aini
 Nathan Alterman, also known as Natan Alterman (1910-1970), Israeli journalist, translator and popular poet
 Ronen Altman Kaydar (born 1972)
 Yehudah Amichai (1924-2000), Israeli poet and one of the first to write in colloquial Hebrew
 Aharon Amir
 Aharon Appelfeld
 Roy Arad
 Dan Armon
 David Avidan (1934–1995), Israeli poet, painter, filmmaker, publicist and playwright

B
Simon Bacher
 Yocheved Bat-Miriam (1901–1979), German-born Israeli
 Menahem Ben (Braun)
 Itamar Ben Canaan
 Yakir Ben Moshe
 Avraham Ben-Yitzhak
 Reuven Ben-Yosef
 Fania Bergstein
 Haim Nachman Bialik (1873-1934)
 Ya'qub Bilbul
 Erez Biton

C
 Ya'akov Cahan (1881-1960)
 T. Carmi
 Miriam Chalfi (writing as Miriam Barukh)
 Rahel Chalfi
 Sami Shalom Chetrit

D
 Menahem Mendel Dolitzki  (1858-1931)

E
Dror Elimelech

F
 Jacob Fichman (1881-1958) a critic, essayist and poet
Ezra Fleischer
 Simeon Samuel Frug (1860-1922), wrote in Russian, Yiddish and Hebrew

G
Yehonatan Geffen
Mordechai Geldman
Amir Gilboa
 Simon Ginzburg (1890-1944)
Haim Gouri
Leah Goldberg (1911-1970), born in Lithuania, immigrated to Israel
Uri Zvi Greenberg (Tur Malka)

H
Simon Halkin
Avigdor Hameiri (1886-1970), born in Carpato-Russ and immigrated to Israel in 1921; also a novelist
Hedva Harekhavi
 Shulamith Hareven
 Paul Hartal
 Galit Hasan-Rokem
 Roy Hasan
Haim Hazaz
 Haim Hefer
 Dalia Hertz
 Amira Hess
Ayin Hillel
Yair Hurvitz

I
 Naphtali Herz Imber (1856-1909), the author of Hatikvah ("The Hope"), called "the Jewish national hymn"

K
Yehudit Kafri
Ben Kalman, see Abraham Reisen
Itzhak Katzenelson (anglicized: Isaac Katzenelson; 1886-1944), perished in Auschwitz
Admiel Kosman
Abba Kovner

L
 Yitzhak Lamdan (1899-1954)
 Yitzhak Laor (born 1948) Israeli poet, author, and journalist
 Haim Lensky, also known as "Hayyim Lensky" (1905–1942 or 1943), Russian poet who wrote in Hebrew; imprisoned in Soviet labor camps after 1934, where he wrote most of his verse
 Giora Leshem
 Hezi Leskali
 Hanoch Levin
 Judah Lob Levin (1845-1925)
 Ephraim Lisitzky (1885-1962)

M
 Meir Leibush Malbim (1809-1879), notable Russian Bible commentator who wrote some poetry in Hebrew
 Salomon Mandelkern (1846-1902), Ukrainian poet and scholar; author of the Hebrew concordance, Hekal Hakodesh
 Mordecai Zvi Mane (1859-1886)
 Reda Mansour
 Salman Masalha
 Margalit Matitiahu
 Agi Mishol (born 1947), Hungarian-born Israeli poet

N
Vaan Nguyen
Tal Nitzán

O
Amir Or

P
Dan Pagis
Alexander Penn
Isaac Loeb Peretz (1851-1915), wrote in Hebrew and Yiddish
 Israel Pinkas
Anda Pinkerfeld Amir
Elisha Porat
 Daniel Preil (1911- )
Gabriel Preil

R
Rachel (Hebrew: רחל) in English, sometimes transcribed as "Ra'hel" or "Rahel", also known as "Rachel the poetess" (Hebrew: רחל המשוררת), pen name of Rachel Bluwstein Sela (1890–1931), poet who immigrated to Palestine in 1909
Yonatan Ratosh
Dahlia Ravikovitch
Janice Rebibo
Abraham Regelson
Abraham Reisen (1870-1953), Russian native who immigrated to the United States; prolific poet and prose writer; pen name: Ben Kalman
Tuvya Ruebner

S
 Rami Saari
 Yossi Sarid
 Zalman Shneur (1887-1959), novelist and poet
 A. A. Schwartz (1846-1931)
 Amir Segal
 Aharon Shabtai
 Yaakov Shabtai
 Amnon Shamossh
 Zalman Shazar
 Naomi Shemer
 David Shimonowitz, also known as "David Shimoni" (1886-1956)
 Abraham Shlonsky
 Tal Slutzker
 Ronny Someck
 Jacob Steinberg (1887-1948)

T
Shaul Tchernichovsky, also known as Saul Tchernihowsky* (1875-1943)
Yoram Taharlev, (1938-present)

V
David Vogel

W
Yona Wallach
Meir Wieseltier

Y
Zvi Yair
Miriam Yalan-Shteklis
Avoth Yeshurun
Natan Yonatan

Z
 Nathan Zach
 Nurit Zarchi
 Zelda
 , also a Russian scholar, commentator and defender of Hassidism
 Stephan Zweig, (1836-1913), wrote in Hebrew and Yiddish
 Eliakum Zunser, (1881-1942), born in Vienna; also a biographer and dramatist

See also
The Modern Hebrew Poem Itself

Notes

Hebrew